The 2022 Western Showdown was held from October 13 to 31 at the Swift Current Curling Club in Swift Current, Saskatchewan. The women's event, sponsored by RBC Dominion Securities, ran from October 13 to 16 and the men's event, sponsored by IG Wealth Management, ran from October 28 to 31. The total purse for the event is $45,000 on the women's side and $36,000 on the men's side.

The event was sponsored by Curling Stadium, a streaming service provided by CurlingZone. All of the games were streamed on CurlingZone and the Swift Current Curling Club's YouTube page.

Men

Teams
The teams are listed as follows:

Knockout brackets

Source:

A event

B event

C event

Knockout results
All draw times are listed in Mountain Time (UTC−06:00).

Draw 1
Friday, October 28, 9:00 am

Draw 2
Friday, October 28, 12:30 pm

Draw 3
Friday, October 28, 4:30 pm

Draw 4
Friday, October 28, 8:00 pm

Draw 5
Saturday, October 29, 10:00 am

Draw 6
Saturday, October 29, 2:00 pm

Draw 7
Saturday, October 29, 7:00 pm

Draw 8
Sunday, October 30, 10:00 am

Draw 9
Sunday, October 30, 2:00 pm

Playoffs

Quarterfinals
Sunday, October 30, 7:00 pm

Semifinals
Monday, October 31, 9:00 am

Final
Monday, October 31, 1:00 pm

Women

Teams
The teams are listed as follows:

Knockout brackets

Source:

A event

B event

C event

Knockout results
All draw times are listed in Mountain Time (UTC−06:00).

Draw 1
Thursday, October 13, 9:00 am

Draw 2
Thursday, October 13, 12:30 pm

Draw 3
Thursday, October 13, 4:30 pm

Draw 4
Thursday, October 13, 8:00 pm

Draw 5
Friday, October 14, 8:30 am

Draw 6
Friday, October 14, 12:00 pm

Draw 7
Friday, October 14, 3:30 pm

Draw 8
Friday, October 14, 8:30 pm

Draw 9
Saturday, October 15, 9:00 am

Draw 10
Saturday, October 15, 12:30 pm

Draw 11
Saturday, October 15, 4:30 pm

Draw 12
Saturday, October 15, 8:00 pm

Playoffs

Quarterfinals
Sunday, October 16, 9:00 am

Semifinals
Sunday, October 16, 12:30 pm

Final
Sunday, October 16, 4:00 pm

Notes

References

External links
Men's Event
Women's Event

2022 in Canadian curling
2022 in curling
Curling in Saskatchewan
October 2022 sports events in Canada
2022 in Saskatchewan
Swift Current